Quay Park is a junction on the Auckland railway network in New Zealand. It normally links Britomart with Newmarket station for Western Line, Southern Line, and Onehunga Line services, which use a common set of tracks (the Newmarket Line) between Britomart and Newmarket. The Strand station has been closed to suburban train services since the opening of Britomart in 2003 and is now used as the terminus for the Auckland–Wellington Northern Explorer service via the North Island Main Trunk line and for chartered excursions. The junction can be switched in order to use The Strand as a backup for Britomart if required.

The Wiri to Quay Park project announced in 2017 is expected to ease congestion on Auckland rail lines, improve rail freight access from the Port of Auckland to the Westfield yards and allow more frequent passenger and freight services. It is associated with the future third mainline. Funding for the project was announced in 2020. The project is to start in 2020 and be completed in 2024. The work at Quay Park will include adding two scissor crossings and separating freight from commuter tracks.

See also
 List of Auckland railway stations

References

Public transport in Auckland
Rail transport in Auckland